Turka is a city located at the confluence of the Stryi River and the Yablunka River in Sambir Raion of Lviv Oblast (region) of western Ukraine (in the  Carpathian Mountains). It hosts the administration of Turka urban hromada, one of the hromadas of Ukraine. Population: .

Until 18 July 2020, Turka belonged to Turka Raion and was the administrative center. The raion was abolished in July 2020 as part of the administrative reform of Ukraine, which reduced the number of raions of Lviv Oblast to seven.

Name
In another version the city's name derives from the Ukrainian name of the gate-towers, "Turia", "Turja", "Turnia", which stood at the entrance to an ancient settlement.

The origin of the name may also be linked to the Turks since the area was under the Hun Empire and they are considered as ancestors of Turks.  Also, Turkic tribes were nomadic, settling in various places and assimilating.

Location

The city is located 137 km from Lviv, 107 km from Uzhhorod, 75 km from Drohobych, at an altitude of 557 meters above sea level.
The location of initial settlement outpost, from which arose Turka, was determined by the so-called "Path of Rus" - Neolithic trade route that connected through the Turka Western Europe to Hungary, Moldova and the Balkan countries.

History 
On June 27, 1431, King Władysław II Jagiełło presented Turka to a man named Vancza Valachus. This was confirmed in 1444 by King Władysław III of Poland, and by Sigismund I the Old in 1517. In 1730 Turka received Magdeburg rights, and three years laters, a Roman Catholic parish was opened here. Until the Partitions of Poland, Turka remained in Kingdom of Poland’s Przemyśl Land, Ruthenian Voivodeship.  From 1772 to 1918 the town belonged to Austrian Galicia.

In the Second Polish Republic, Turka was the seat of a county in Lwów Voivodeship. It was home to a county court, private high school and tax office. In 1921, Turka had the population of 10 030, including 4 201 Jews. At that time, its starosta was Tadeusz Zawistowski, and the mayor was Michał Grudziński.

Following the September 1939 Invasion of Poland, Turka was occupied by the Soviet Union. In June 1941, the town was captured by the Wehrmacht, and its Jewish population was murdered in the Holocaust. After World War II, the town was reattached to the Soviet Ukraine, and its Polish community was expelled to the so-called Recovered Territories.

Until 18 July 2020, Turka served as the administrative center of Turka Raion. The raion was abolished in July 2020 as part of the administrative reform of Ukraine, which reduced the number of raions of Lviv Oblast to seven. The area of Turka Raion was merged into Sambir Raion.

Demography 
The population is 7306 people in 1114 homes (2006) 99% of the population are Ukrainian.

Dynamics of population in the past:
 1880 — 4,685 inhabitants (1,786 Rusyns, 537 Poles, 2,356 German; of them: 1,837 Greek-Catholic, 450 Catholics, 2,398 Jews).
 1916 — 6,080 inhabitants (including - 3,000 Jews)
 1921 — 10,030 inhabitants (including - 4,201 Jews).
 1989 — 7,982 inhabitants (3,992 male, 3,990 female)
 2001 — 7,440 inhabitants
 2006 — 7,306 inhabitants

Sights 
 Church of the transfer of the relics of St. Nicholas, Turka (1776)
 Church of St. Nicholas, Turka (1739)
 Assumption of the Blessed Virgin Mary Church, Turka (1750)
 Protection of the Blessed Virgin Mary Church, Turka (1780)
 Church of Saints Peter and Paul, Turka (2003)
 Assumption Church, Turka (1778)
 Synagogue, Turka (19th century)
 Old Jewish Cemetery, Turka (19th century)
 Market Square, Turka
 Folk Museum of Boykos, Boykivshchyna
 Museum of Boykos books

Notable people born in Turka
 Abba Hushi (1898—1969) — Israeli politician,  mayor of Haifa (1951–1969)
 Zygmunt Albert (1908—2001) — Polish doctor, pathologist, Professor of Medicine, President of Wrocław Medical University (1950–1954)
 Ihor Gerych (1961) — Ukrainian surgeon, Professor of Medicine, Нead of the regional ministries of health of Lviv Oblast (2005–2009)
 Mykhailo Melnyk (1889—1944) — Ukrainian military and political leader
 Ira Moskowitz (1912—2001)  —  American Graphic Artist
 Stepan Popel (1907—1987)  — Ukrainian and American chess player,  multiple chess champion of Lviv, Paris and eventually, of the Ukrainians in North America (United States and Canada)
 Karl Schein (1911—1973)  — Polish and Israeli surgeon, Professor of Medicine, Chief surgeon of Polish army, director of the medical clinic in Haifa.
 Yuriy Tarnawsky (1934) — Ukrainian poet and novelist, one of the founding members of the New York Group, a Ukrainian émigré avant-garde group of writers, and co-founder and co-editor of the journal Novi Poeziyi (New Poetry; 1959–1972).
 Marian Promiński (1908—1971)  — Polish poet, novelist, essayist, film critic, dramaturge, translator of Anglo-Saxon literature.
 Ivan Fedevych (1883—1939) — Ukrainian social and political leader, a Greek Catholic priest.
 Myron Utrysko (1908–1988) — Ukrainian social and political leader.
 Teodor Rożankowśkyj (1875—1970) — Ukrainian political and military leader, a lawyer, the first commander of the Legion of Ukrainian Sich Riflemen.
 Myron Yusypovych (1957) — Ukrainian artist chief conductor of the Symphony Orchestra K&K Phіlharmonіker of agency  Da Capo Musіkmarketіng Gmbh, Austria, director of choir  K&K Opernchor, Honored Artist of Ukraine
 Adam Karpinski (1897–1939) — Polish alpinist, a mechanical engineer, aircraft designer, pilot.

References

External links
Turka history and photos (in Ukrainian)
Turka history (in Ukrainian)
Turka  in Geographical Dictionary of the Kingdom of Poland (1889)
Memorial Book of the Community of Turka on the Stryj and Vicinity (Turka, Ukraine)
Turka: slideshow
 Turka: history slideshow (1900-1935)
Turka: Congress of Boykos (slideshow)
Turka: Xsmas song (slideshow)
Turka: City tour (slideshow)
Turka: Homemade machine "Dyha" (slideshow)
Turka, Ukraine | By Ukraine Channel
Turka: photos

Cities in Lviv Oblast
Kingdom of Galicia and Lodomeria
Lwów Voivodeship
Shtetls
Cities of district significance in Ukraine
Holocaust locations in Ukraine